Shahalia (sometimes also Shalia, Shahlia) is a last name that is now primarily found in the erstwhile unified Punjab (British India) region of northern India presently known as Himachal Pradesh and in some parts of Jammu and Kashmir.  People with this last name have generally taken to farming after Indian Independence and related economic activity.  Some have moved to metropolitan cities after attaining higher education.

History and Founding
They are said to have originated from ancient Aryan warrior tribes.  They were primarily archers and swordsmen on foot, with certain clans mastering mounted warfare. They are snake, fire and sun worshipers.  However, this does not prevent them from honoring local Gods and Deities including Sufi dargahs.  They are historically a people owing no allegiance to any social order, community or kingdom.  Their rogue nature has earned them a repute for being honorable, upright, fearless, stubborn, difficult and truthful.  The surname Shahalia relates back to these people's place of origin, namely Shal, somewhere towards the west of the Indian subcontinent that is currently untraceable owing to antiquity and also due to poor recording of history among the Shahalias due to their flux from place to place, frequent warring and conflict and thus their knowledge system being primarily dependent on smriti (memory) rather than written text.

Social Order
Members under this last name are categorized by some under the Kshatriya caste in the Indian caste system.  However, there is no proof of their ever having been rulers of a kingdom or region.

Distribution
The majority of people with the surname Shahalia reside in Himachal Pradesh and some in Jammu and Kashmir and Punjab, India, apart from cities such as Delhi, Mumbai, etc.

See also
 Kshatriya
 Himachal Pradesh
 Jammu and Kashmir

References 

Surnames
Indian surnames